HD 37646 is a double star in the northern constellation of Auriga. The pair have an angular separation of 26.005″.

References

External links
 HR 1945
 CCDM J05414+2929
 Image HD 37646

Auriga (constellation)
037646
Double stars
026781
B-type subgiants
1945
Durchmusterung objects